Jones v. Van Zandt, 46 U.S. (5 How.) 215 (1847), was a landmark US Supreme Court decision involving the constitutionality of slavery that was a predecessor of Dred Scott v. Sandford. The Supreme Court was then led by Chief Justice Roger Taney, who owned slaves and wrote the Dred Scott decision but not Jones. The Court unanimously reached the decision that the Fugitive Slave Act was constitutional and that the institution of slavery remained a matter for individual states to decide.

Background
John Van Zandt was an abolitionist who aided the Underground Railroad resistance movement in Ohio after having been a slaveholder in Kentucky. At about three on Sunday morning, two white men on horseback stopped a wagon with a closed cover being driven by a black man. The wagon belonged to Van Zandt, who got out and tried to free the reins. Inside were several black people. The driver and a 30-year-old black man named Andrew escaped, but the slavecatchers took the wagon with the rest to a jail in Covington, Kentucky, across the Ohio River and about 10 miles from the stop.

Wharton Jones owned Andrew and eight other slaves in Boone County, Kentucky, about 12 or 14 miles from the stop. He sued Zandt in federal court in Ohio for aiding the escaping slaves by relying upon the Fugitive Slave Act of 1793. Justice McLean, riding circuit, conducted the jury trial. Salmon P. Chase and Bell unsuccessfully defended Van Zandt; the jury decided in Jones' favor.

Van Zandt appealed, through his attorneys, including William H. Seward. Abolitionists used Van Zandt's Supreme Court appeal as a vehicle to reach the underlying constitutional question since Ohio had been free since the Northwest Ordinance, even before statehood. Van Zandt argued unsuccessfully that the he was only giving a ride to black people walking on an Ohio road and that law of Ohio presumed all people were free. During the trial, witnesses stated that Van Zandt said that he knew they were escaped slaves but ought to be free.

Decision
Justice Levi Woodbury, who did not own slaves, announced the unanimous decision of the court. No formal notice of fugitive status was required before apprehension since the circumstances showed both notice and concealment. The constitutionality of the fugitive slave law had been established by Justice Joseph Story in Prigg v. Pennsylvania.

The historian Paul Finkelman believes that the decision laid the groundwork for Dred Scott because it put whites on notice that any black might be a slave and found that no black had any rights under the Constitution.

References

External links
 

United States Supreme Court cases
United States Supreme Court cases of the Taney Court
United States slavery case law